Thyenula is a genus of African jumping spiders that was first described by Eugène Louis Simon in 1902.

Species
 it contains twenty-four species, found only in Africa:
Thyenula alotama Wesolowska, Azarkina & Russell-Smith, 2014 – South Africa
Thyenula ammonis Denis, 1947 – Egypt
Thyenula arcana (Wesolowska & Cumming, 2008) – Zimbabwe
Thyenula armata Wesolowska, 2001 – South Africa, Lesotho
Thyenula aurantiaca (Simon, 1902) – South Africa
Thyenula cheliceroides Wesolowska, Azarkina & Russell-Smith, 2014 – South Africa
Thyenula clarosignata Wesolowska, Azarkina & Russell-Smith, 2014 – South Africa
Thyenula dentatidens Wesolowska, Azarkina & Russell-Smith, 2014 – South Africa
Thyenula fidelis Wesolowska & Haddad, 2009 – South Africa
Thyenula haddadi Wesolowska, Azarkina & Russell-Smith, 2014 – South Africa
Thyenula juvenca Simon, 1902 (type) – South Africa
Thyenula leighi (Peckham & Peckham, 1903) – South Africa
Thyenula magna Wesolowska & Haddad, 2009 – South Africa
Thyenula montana Wesolowska, Azarkina & Russell-Smith, 2014 – Lesotho
Thyenula munda (Peckham & Peckham, 1903) – Zimbabwe
Thyenula natalica (Simon, 1902) – South Africa
Thyenula oranjensis Wesolowska, 2001 – South Africa
Thyenula rufa Wesolowska, Azarkina & Russell-Smith, 2014 – South Africa
Thyenula sempiterna Wesolowska, 2000 – Zimbabwe, South Africa
Thyenula splendens Wesołowska & Haddad, 2018 – South Africa
Thyenula tenebrica Wesolowska, Azarkina & Russell-Smith, 2014 – South Africa
Thyenula virgulata Wesolowska, Azarkina & Russell-Smith, 2014 – South Africa
Thyenula vulnifica Wesolowska, Azarkina & Russell-Smith, 2014 – South Africa
Thyenula wesolowskae Zhang & Maddison, 2012 – South Africa

References

Salticidae genera
Salticidae
Spiders of Africa
Spiders of Asia